So Many Rivers is the fifteenth studio album by American singer-songwriter Bobby Womack. The album was released in 1985, by MCA Records. The album debuted at number 66 on the Billboard 200.

Track listing

Personnel
Bobby Womack - vocals, percussion, backing vocals
David T. Walker, Jeff Baxter, Robert Palmer - guitar
David Shields, Nathan Watts - bass guitar
Dan Lee Butts, Michael Wycoff - keyboards
Frank "Rusty" Hamilton - synthesizer
James Gadson - percussion, backing vocals
Paulinho Da Costa - percussion
Dorothy Ashby - harp
Alltrinna Grayson, Curtis Womack, Friendly Womack, Jr., Kathy Bloxson, Kathy Wesley, Mary "Baby Sister" Clayton, Stephanie Spruill, The Waters, Vesta Williams - backing vocals

Critical reception 
So Many Rivers was ranked number 8 among the "Albums of the Year" for 1985 by NME.

References

1985 albums
Bobby Womack albums
Albums produced by Bobby Womack
MCA Records albums